The Swedish Men's Curling Championship is the national championship of men's curling in Sweden. It has been held annually since 1917 (one of the oldest national championship in curling).

List of champions

(below teams line-up in order: fourth, third, second, lead, alternate, coach; skips marked bold)

References

See also
Swedish Women's Curling Championship
Swedish Mixed Curling Championship
Swedish Mixed Doubles Curling Championship
Swedish Junior Curling Championships
Swedish Senior Curling Championships